The kliros (Greek: κλῆρος klēros, plural κλῆροι klēroi; Slavonic: клиросъ, "kliros" or sometimes крилосъ, "krilos") is the section of an Eastern Orthodox or Eastern Catholic church dedicated to the choir. It refers both to the general space in which chanters or singers assemble for the services, as well as to the actual music stand or shelves on which music is stored and read.

Overview
The name derives from the Greek word for "lot", since originally those who read and sang were chosen by lot.

Historically, in cathedrals, monasteries and larger establishments such as chapels belonging to seminaries and major parishes, there would have been kliroi on both right and left sides of the church. The result is two choirs which sing antiphonally, much as monastic and cathedral choirs of the Western Churches still have today.  This was the practice in the Byzantine Imperial Cathedral of Hagia Sophia, in Constantinople, whose historical liturgical practice became the standard for all churches following the Byzantine liturgical tradition.

This arrangement presupposes a number of singers on each side, adding up to a reasonably large total, and two highly trained chanters skilled in leading the services. Unfortunately, highly trained chanters are exceedingly rare today, and most churches have only the one kliros, often to the right of the iconostasis. Nevertheless, some patriarchal cathedrals, larger monastic communities, seminaries, and places with sufficient resources and singers, may continue to have two kliroi.

The Russian Orthodox Church will often have, in addition to a kliros by the iconostasis, a  choir loft above the great doors of the west entrance of the church.

In churches of the Greek and some parts of the Russian tradition, chanters and men who sing at the kliros will often wear a black riassa (outer-cassock). In the Armenian tradition, both men and women of the choir at the kliros will wear a stikharion (robe made out of fine material).

References

External links
Kliros - Russian Orthodox free archive of church singing materials
Клирос в интерьере русского храма в XVII—XVIII веках

Church architecture
Eastern Christian liturgical objects